Jorge González (born 5 January 1949) is a Puerto Rican former swimmer. He competed in six events at the 1968 Summer Olympics.

References

External links
 

1949 births
Living people
Puerto Rican male swimmers
Olympic swimmers of Puerto Rico
Swimmers at the 1968 Summer Olympics
Sportspeople from Havana
20th-century Puerto Rican people